The REYL Group, styled REYL Intesa Sanpaolo, is a financial services company founded in Geneva in 1973 by Dominique REYL. REYL provides financial advisory and investment services to private and institutional clients.

REYL specialises in wealth management, entrepreneur & family office services, corporate finance, asset services and asset management.  In 2022, REYL & Cie increased its assets under management by 37% in the space of one year and reached 18.1 billion francs. Including minority interests, its overall assets jumped 52% to reach 38.7 billion francs.

Through its various subsidiaries, the REYL Group is present in Europe, the Middle East, Asia and Latin America.

History 
Dominique Reyl founded the Compagnie Financière d'Etudes et de Gestion (CFEG), a portfolio management company in Geneva in 1973. In January 1988 CFEG's activities were transferred into REYL & Cie and in 1999, REYL & Cie was granted the authorised securities dealer status. François Reyl, son of Dominique, joined REYL in 2002. 

In 2003 the Asset Management business line was launched, followed by the Corporate & Family Governance business line in 2006.

In 2008, François Reyl was appointed Chief Executive Officer and REYL moved its headquarters to upscale rue du Rhône, in Geneva. A year later, REYL opened an office in Luxemburg and an independent subsidiary in Singapore.

After having been granted a banking licence in 2010, REYL & Cie continued its expansion by opening a first Swiss branch in Zurich and founding REYL Overseas Ltd., a licensed Registered Investment Advisor with the U.S. Securities and Exchange Commission, enabling the Group to provide investment advisory services to US tax-compliant individuals. The affiliate opened its first branch in Dallas in 2016.

The fourth business line Corporate Finance, widening the scope of services provided, was launched in 2012, the same year as the opening of a second Swiss branch in Lugano.

In 2013, REYL established a UK presence with the incorporation of REYL & CO (UK) LLP. The same year, the Group's name was associated with the Cahuzac affair, involving former French Finance Minister Jérôme Cahuzac; charges were rapidly dropped in Switzerland in 2014, the Bank was sentenced to a fine in France in 2017.

In 2015 REYL expanded into its fifth business line, Asset Services, as part of its diversification strategy, obtained a fund custodian license in Malta and opened REYL Finance (MEA) Ltd, awarded with a commercial license from the Dubai Financial Services Authority.

In 2017, REYL made a minority investment in Aspiration, an online banking platform based in Los Angeles, which was awarded as one of the most innovative companies of the world by Fast Company. The same year REYL was awarded Outstanding Boutique Private Bank in Switzerland.

In 2018, REYL made a partnership with Hermance Capital Partner, an investment fund platform focused on non-listed assets and sold a material stake in RAM Active Investments to Mediobanca. Pâris Bertrand was acquired in 2021 by the Swiss subsidiary of Rothschild & Co. AG. Hermance Capital Partners is currently a division of the latter.

In January 2022, REYL finalised the acquisition of a 40 per cent stake in the Geneva-based private bank "1875 Finance".

In 2019, REYL & Cie created Asteria Investment Managers, an asset management subsidiary dedicated to social and environmental impact.

In 2020, Alpian, a digital bank incubated by the REYL Group, is launched to offer comprehensive and premium digital banking services.

In 2021, it entered into a strategic partnership with Fideuram - Intesa Sanpaolo Private Banking, a leading European banking player, pursuant to which Fideuram ISP acquired a 69% stake in REYL & Cie.

In addition, in the context of this partnership, REYL also integrated Banque Morval, a Swiss establishment controlled by Intesa Sanpaolo since 2017.

In December 2021, REYL also acquired a 40% stake in 1875 Finance, a Geneva-based multi-family office and independent asset manager with over CHF 13 billion of assets under management for private clients.

In 2022, REYL & Cie acquired a 40% stake in 1875 Finance, a Geneva-based multi-family office and independent asset manager.

Offshore business / Conviction 
In connection with the "Cahuzac affair" involving the French finance minister Jérôme Cahuzac, a French court in December 2016 sentenced the bank to a fine of 1.875 million euros and the general manager François Reyl to a suspended prison sentence of one year and a fine of 375,000 euros. The court found that Bank Reyl had served as an "instrument for the concealment of assets" of former French Finance Minister Jérôme Cahuzac.

Management 
The Bank operates under the direction of six partners : François Reyl, Pasha Bakhtiar, Nicolas Duchêne, Christian Fringhian, Thomas Fontaine and Lorenzo Rocco di Torrepadula. Their activity is overseen by a board of directors (2021) comprising Christian Merle (chairman), Michel Broch (vice-chairman), Yves Claude Aubert, Liane Elias Hoffman Ruth Metzler-Arnold Tommaso Corcos, Lino Mainolfi and Riccardo Barbarini.

Corporate social responsibility 
In 2014, REYL founded Research for Life, a Swiss non-profit foundation dedicated to supporting and funding medical research projects in the fields of adult and pediatric oncology.

Since 2014, REYL supports the Orchestre de la Suisse Romande. REYL also supports mountain climber Sophie Lavaud, the first Franco-Swiss woman to conquer 8 of the 14 highest summits in the Himalayas.

In 2019, the REYL Group became an official partner of the Swiss Paralympic, the umbrella organisation for Swiss handicapped athletes. The REYL Group supported the Swiss athletes who were selected by the Swiss Paralympic to take part in the Tokyo 2020 and Beijing 2022 Paralympics.

In 2020, the REYL Group announces its support for the International Union for Conservation of Nature (IUCN), a democratic union of influential organisations and renowned experts with the shared goal of protecting and conserving nature and accelerating the transition to sustainable development. The Group is supporting the IUCN “Save Our Species” programme in particular, in order to strengthen its work to protect endangered species and plants.

AUMs

2021 key consolidated financials: assets in excess of CHF 25 billion (CHF 38.7 billion including minority interests), CHF 145 million operating income; 18.7%+ Tier 1 Ratio; CHF 3.1 billion total balance sheet.

References 

Banks established in 1973
Banks of Switzerland
Swiss companies established in 1973
Companies based in Geneva
2021 mergers and acquisitions